Teal is a greenish-blue color. Its name comes from that of a bird—the Eurasian teal (Anas crecca)—which presents a similarly colored stripe on its head. The word is often used colloquially to refer to shades of cyan in general.

It can be created by mixing cyan into a green base, or deepened as needed with black or gray. The complementary color of teal is pink. It is also one of the first group of 16 HTML/CSS web colors formulated in 1987. In the RGB model used to create colors on computer screens and televisions, teal is created by reducing the brightness of cyan to about one half.

Teal was a fad color during the 1990s, with, among others, many sports teams adopting the color for their uniforms.

Etymology
The first recorded use of teal as a color name in English was in 1917. The term teal (referring to a sort of duck) is derived from the Middle English tele, a word akin to the Dutch taling and the Middle Low German telink.

Variations

Teal blue

Teal blue is a medium tone of teal with more blue. The first recorded use of teal blue as a color name in English was in 1927.

The source of this color is the Plochere Color System, a color system formulated in 1948 that is widely used by interior designers. Teal was subsequently a heavily used color in the 1950s and 1960s.

Teal blue is also the name of a Crayola crayon color (color #113) from 1990 to 2003.

Teal green

Teal green is a darker shade of teal with more green. It is a variable color averaging a dark bluish-green that is green, darker, and stronger than invisible green or pine tree.

Teal green is most closely related to the Crayola crayon color Deep Space Sparkle.

Deep sea green

Deep sea green is one of the paint color manufactured & marketed by American paint company Benjamin Moore.

In culture

Aviation TEAL is the acronym for Tasman Empire Airways Limited, the forerunner of Air New Zealand, who used teal as their airline's signature color; it appeared not just on plane livery but promotional material and airline bags. When New Zealanders refer to ‘teal green,’ they are more likely referring to the airline color than the bird's color.

Rapid transit Teal is the official color of Kochi Metro, the rapid transit system serving the city of Kochi in India.

Flags 
The flag of Hungary contains a greenish-teal horizontal stripe.
The flag of Mozambique contains a greenish-teal horizontal stripe.
The flag of Cameroon contains a greenish-teal vertical stripe.
The teal stripe in the flag of Sri Lanka represents Sri Lankan Muslims.
In the Philippines, The provincial flag of Surigao del Norte is bluish-teal.
The flag of Kazakhstan is bluish-teal with a yellow star and eagle.
Since 2022, the flag of Honduras contains a bluish-teal stripes with five bluish-teal stars.

Business A Teal organisation is an emerging organisational paradigm.

Insects Some dragonflies are cyan or teal.

Sports
Teal is the jersey color of the Belfast Giants. The color was chosen to be a neutral color in the often heated sporting environments of Belfast. It is also worn by the Charlotte Hornets of the NBA and The Port Adelaide Football Club in the AFL also feature teal in their team colors.
The Jacksonville Jaguars of the NFL use teal as one of their primary colors. The Miami Dolphins use a variation called Aqua as their primary color. The Philadelphia Eagles also use a variation called Midnight Green.
Two teams in Major League Baseball use the color teal. The Seattle Mariners use a variant known as "Northwest Green" as one of their primary colors while the Arizona Diamondbacks use teal as an alternate color.
In the National Hockey League, The San Jose Sharks use a variation called Deep Pacific Teal as their primary color. The Mighty Ducks of Anaheim used a variation of teal known as Jade as a primary color until 2006 when the team was rebranded to the Anaheim Ducks. The color is still used today on the team's alternate uniform.
The Penrith Panthers of the NRL used in the early 2000s teal as a secondary color.
The Griquas of the Currie Cup use teal as primary color (although is officially defined peacock blue)

Foods Gummy bears are commonly teal.

Computing
Windows 95 featured a teal-colored default wallpaper.
Heroes of Might and Magic III featured a teal-colored party.

Film 
The "orange and teal look" is a trend in 21st-century filmmaking, in which scenes are color graded to emphasize these two complementary colors.
In 2008 Pixar, film, the character in WALL-E, Eve features bluish-teal eyes.

TV series
Perry the Platypus, one of the main characters in the TV series Phineas and Ferb, is teal.
Ash Ketchum, the main character on Pokémon, wore a dark teal t-shirt during the earlier seasons.
Martha Jones, a companion of the Tenth Doctor, wore a teal t-shirt on her debut Smith and Jones.
The Wives of Commanders in The Handmaid's Tale (TV series) wear teal.
Characters in the South Korean television series Squid Game wear teal tracksuits as their game uniform.
The YouTube series Half-Life VR but the AI is Self-Aware posted by wayneradiotv features a character named Tommy, who states that "Teal means need meal," referencing the Black Mesa Sweet Voice.

Religion The Hermit Intercessors of the Lamb, a Christian contemplation group in the state of Nebraska, wears habits with a teal scapular to symbolize intercession between heaven (blue) and earth. Originally organised as a Roman Catholic association, it was suppressed in 2010 by the Archbishop of Omaha, who directed members to cease wearing the scapular in Church activities.

Politics In Australia, the color teal, and the term "teal independents", have become associated with a group of independent candidates in the 2022 Australian federal election who campaigned on a platform emphasizing climate change action, tackling corruption in politics, and gender equality. Supported by Climate 200, candidates are also standing in the 2022 Victorian state election.

Art History Green pigments for paints and fabric dyes were difficult to obtain from nature in the past, thus they were rarely employed in clothes or heraldic emblems. While green may have been blended with blue and yellow paints, mixing dissimilar substances was frowned upon due to suspicion of alchemy. Only during the early Renaissance did the superstitious custom fade away, and in the late eighteenth century, the German Swedish scientist Carl Wilhelm Scheele found new copper greens.

Issue awareness Teal is the color of ovarian cancer awareness. Ovarian cancer survivors and supporters may wear teal ribbons, bracelets, T-shirts, and hats to bring public attention to the disease.

See also
Lists of colors

References

External links

Tertiary colors
Shades of blue
Shades of cyan
Web colors